Australian arowana is a common name for several fishes and may refer to:

Scleropages jardinii
Scleropages leichardti